Shipstead is a surname. Notable people with the surname include:

 Henrik Shipstead (1881–1960), American politician
 Maggie Shipstead (born 1983), American author